Belén Estévez (b. Buenos Aires, September 25, 1984) is an Argentinian dancer and vedette who began her career in Peru. She is known for winning "El Gran Show" in 2010 and 2011.

Reality show 
 2010: El Gran Show (season 2)... Winner 
 2010: El Gran Show: Reyes del Show... 2nd place
 2011: El Gran Show 2011 (season 2)... 2nd place
 2011: El Gran Show 2011: Reyes del Show... Winner 
 2012: El Gran Show... Coach

References

1981 births
People from Buenos Aires
Living people
Argentine female dancers
Argentine vedettes